Ren'ai Road (also called 3rd Blvd and sometimes spelled RenAi, Renai or Jen-Ai) is a major arterial road in Taipei, Taiwan, connecting the Xinyi District in the east with the Daan and Zhongzheng districts towards the west.  Renai Road forms a one-way couplet with Xinyi Road between Taipei City Hall and Zhongshan Road, with Ren'ai for westbound traffic and Xinyi for eastbound traffic.  Ren'ai Road (along with Dunhua and Zhongshan roads) is known as one of Taipei's more "beautiful" roads, with the heavily landscaped medians dividing the road into local and express lanes.  Along with Xinyi Road, Ren'ai Road has a contraflow bus only lane in the middle of the roadway.

Sections 
Unlike other Taipei arterials, Ren'ai Road does not have directional sections dividing the entire stretch of road, only divided-numbered sections.
 Section 1 : Zhongshan S. Road - Hangzhou S. Road
 Section 2 : Hangzhou S. Road - Xinsheng S. Road
 Section 3 : Xinsheng S. Road - Fuxing S. Road
 Section 4 : Fuxing S. Road - Shifu Road

Major intersections 
 Zhongshan Road
 Linsen Road
 Jinshan Road
 Xinsheng Road
 Jianguo Road
 Fuxing Road
 Dunhua Road
 Yanji Street
 Guangfu Road
 Shifu Road

Other 
The eastern terminus of Ren'ai Road is designed with unique aesthetic features since the end of the road faces the entrance of Taipei City Hall.

See also
 List of roads in Taiwan

Streets in Taipei